

This is a list of the National Register of Historic Places listings in Northeast Philadelphia.

This is intended to be a complete list of the properties and districts on the National Register of Historic Places in Northeast Philadelphia, Pennsylvania, United States. The locations of National Register properties and districts for which the latitude and longitude coordinates are included below, may be seen in an online map.

There are 599 properties and districts listed on the National Register in Philadelphia, including 67 National Historic Landmarks. Northeast Philadelphia includes 72 of these properties and districts, including 1 National Historic Landmark; the city's remaining properties and districts are listed elsewhere. One site is split between Northeast Philadelphia and other parts of the city, and is thus included on multiple lists.

Current listings

|}

See also

 List of National Historic Landmarks in Philadelphia
 National Register of Historic Places listings in Philadelphia, Pennsylvania

References

Buildings and structures in Philadelphia
Northeast Philadelphia
Northeast Philadelphia